Armenian National Assembly was the governing body of the Armenian millet in the Ottoman Empire, established by the Armenian National Constitution of 1863.

Notes

Ottoman period in Armenia
1863 establishments in the Ottoman Empire